Paisley St James railway station is on the Inverclyde Line, serving one of the residential districts of  the town, just west of the town centre. For passengers travelling to the commercial district,  is the main railway station of Paisley and is located in the heart of Paisley town centre.
There is an ongoing campaign to rename the station "Paisley St Mirren" due to the station's proximity to St Mirren's new stadium.

History
The station was opened on 29 March 1841 by the Glasgow, Paisley and Greenock Railway company.

Services
On Sunday, there is an hourly service each way.

Relocation

On 13 October 2016, Glasgow Airport Rail Link plans were revived with a PRT option proposed. If this plan goes ahead, then Paisley St James would be relocated to a site next to Junction 29 of the M8. A PRT to the airport is also proposed from this station.

References

Notes

Sources

External links 

 Dedicated historical web page

Railway stations in Renfrewshire
Former Caledonian Railway stations
Railway stations in Great Britain opened in 1841
SPT railway stations
Railway stations served by ScotRail
Transport in Paisley, Renfrewshire
Buildings and structures in Paisley, Renfrewshire
1841 establishments in Scotland